Surface is an American psychological thriller television series created by Veronica West for Apple TV+. It premiered on July 29, 2022.
In December 2022, the series was renewed for a second season.

Premise
After surviving a suicide attempt, Sophie has lost her recent memories, including the reason why she decided to jump, and she tries to piece together the reasons for her attempted suicide.

Cast
 Gugu Mbatha-Raw as Sophie Ellis / Tess Caldwell
 Oliver Jackson-Cohen as James Ellis
 Ari Graynor as Caroline
 François Arnaud as Harrison
 Millie Brady as Eliza
 Marianne Jean-Baptiste as Hannah
 Stephan James as Baden
 Markian Tarasiuk as Elliot

Episodes

Production
The project was given a straight to series order in November 2020, with Gugu Mbatha-Raw set to star as well as co-executive produce.

In June 2021, Oliver Jackson-Cohen, Stephan James, Ari Graynor, Marianne Jean-Baptiste, François Arnaud and Millie Brady were added to the cast.

Filming for the series had commenced by July 1, 2021, in Vancouver.

The series premiered on July 29, 2022, with the first three episodes available immediately and the rest debuting on a weekly basis.

On December 2, 2022, the series was renewed for a second season, with production moving to London.

Reception
The review aggregator website Rotten Tomatoes reported a 53% approval rating with an average rating of 6.3/10, based on 17 critic reviews. The website's critics consensus reads, "Gugu Mbatha-Raw's captivating performance gives Surface some depth, but this overheated potboiler only gets murkier the more it tries to spice up a derivative amnesia mystery." Metacritic, which uses a weighted average, assigned a score of 47 out of 100 based on 14 critics, indicating "mixed or average reviews".

References

External links
 

2020s American drama television series
2022 American television series debuts
American thriller television series
Apple TV+ original programming
Television shows set in San Francisco
Television shows filmed in California
Television shows filmed in Vancouver
English-language television shows
Psychological thriller television series
Fiction about amnesia
Suicide in television